Bârlești may refer to several villages in Romania:

 Bârlești, a village in Bistra Commune, Alba County
 Bârleștiand Bârleşti-Cătun, villages in Mogoș Commune, Alba County
 Bârlești, a village in Scărişoara Commune, Alba County
 Bârlești, a village in Erbiceni Commune, Iaşi County